Team Essex VC is a volleyball team based in Chelmsford, Great Britain since 2013. The club consists of a men's teams and a women's team that play in Volleyball England's English National Volleyball League. The Men's 1st team play in Volleyball England's Division 1. The Women's 1st team play in Division 2.

Achievements
 Team Essex Trinity (Women)
 English Shield Runners Up 2016 
 Promotion to National League Division 1

 Team Essex Blaze (Men)
 English National League Division 1 Champions, 2017
 English Shield Runners Up 2015
 English National League Division 2 (South) Champions, 2013

History
The club was set up in 2013 by James Bernardi, Paul French and Steven Rosser. The men and women's teams are conglomerates, the men formed through the partnership of Brentwood VC, Chelmsford VC and Boswells, the women formed as a result of a partnership with Brentwood VC, Chelmsford VC and Southend VC. The mergers gave the best volleyballers in Essex the chance to compete together at a higher level. The club has grown from strength to strength in a very short period of time, and now boasts a men's team in the top league in the country, The Super League and in Division 1. The women's team represents Team Essex in Division 2 of the National Volleyball League.

2017–2018 season
 Blaze
The 2017–2018 season saw the Men's 1st team finish 7th in the last ever season of Volleyball England's Super 8 league. This finish was good enough to secure their spot in the inaugural new Super League format, consisting of 10 teams. The result was an all round success for the newly promoted Blaze team who satisfied their goal of retaining their top division status in the first year since their promotion.

Trinity

The 2017–2018 season saw the Women's 1st team finish 7th in Volleyball England's Division 1. As a result, Trinity will play in this league for the forthcoming season.

Current rosters
 Team Essex Blaze

 Team Essex Trinity

Notable former players

References

Promotion
Men's Shield Runner Up
Women's Shield Runner Up
Women Promotion
Men Promotion 2013

External links
 Official Website  

Volleyball clubs established in 2013
English volleyball clubs
Sport in Chelmsford